Bruce Lawrence Horn (born 1960) is a programmer and creator. He created the Macintosh Finder and the Macintosh Resource Manager for Apple Computer. His signature is amongst those molded to the case of the Macintosh 128K. He is a distinguished engineer at Siri and Language Technologies at Apple since June 2022.

A member of the original Apple Macintosh design team, Horn received a B.S. in Mathematical Sciences from Stanford University in 1982 and a M.S. and Ph.D. from Carnegie-Mellon University in Computer Science in 1994. Horn was a student in the Learning Research Group (1973–1981), where Smalltalk was developed. While there, he worked on various projects including the NoteTaker, a portable Smalltalk machine, and wrote the initial Dorado Smalltalk microcode for Smalltalk.

He owns, and programs software for, Ingenuity Software. He was employed by Powerset as the principal development manager of the Natural Language Technology group. Powerset was acquired by Microsoft in the fall of 2008 and is part of Bing.

Horn was an Intel Fellow and Chief Scientist for Smart Device Innovation in the New Devices Group then became CTO, Saffron Technology Group at Intel Corporation.

Horn serves on the board of advisors of The Hyperwords Company Ltd of the UK, which works to make the web more usefully interactive and which has produced the free Firefox Add-On called 'Hyperwords'.

References

External links

 Home page
 Bruce Horn on 1984, Today, and Beyond - April 26, 2004
 Joining the Mac Group: The Reality Distortion Field changes Bruce's mind about working at Apple, written by Bruce Horn
 The Grand Unified Model (1) - Resources

1960 births
Apple Inc. employees
Carnegie Mellon University alumni
Stanford University alumni
Living people
Scientists at PARC (company)